Sir Garfield Sobers (also known as Gary or Garry Sobers) is a former international cricketer who represented the West Indies cricket team between 1954 and 1974. He scored centuries (100 or more runs in an innings) on 26 occasions. Widely acknowledged as the "greatest all-rounder", he was described by Australian cricketer Don Bradman as a "five-in-one cricketer". In 93 Tests, Sobers scored 8,032 runsat a batting average of 57.78and claimed 235 wickets. He held the record for most runs by a player in Test cricket until 1981. Sobers was named one of the five Wisden Cricketers of the Year in 1964, and one of the five Wisden Cricketers of the Century in 2000. He entered into the ICC Cricket Hall of Fame when the International Cricket Council (ICC) formally inducted him alongside 55 initial inductees in 2009.

Sobers made his Test debut against Pakistan in 1954. He scored his first century (365 not out) against the same team during the third Test of the 1957–58 home series. In the event, he became the youngest player to complete a triple century. Sobers' innings remained the highest individual score in Test cricket for 36 years until it was transcended by Brian Lara in 1994; the innings, however, remains the highest maiden century for a player in Tests. In the fourth Test of the same series, Sobers went on to score centuries in both the innings; he ended up scoring 824 runs at an average of 137.33 in the series. In terms of centuries scored, he was most successful against England (10 centuries). Sobers made scores of 150 or more in a Test match innings on thirteen occasions, and was dismissed five times between scores of 90 and 99. , he has the third-highest number of centuries for West Indies in Tests.

Sobers made his solitary One Day International (ODI) appearance in a match against England in September 1973; he was dismissed for a duck.

Key

Test cricket centuries

Notes

References 

Sobers, Garfield
Sobers